Anthony Walker (born ) is a Wales international rugby league footballer who plays as a  for the Widnes Vikings in the Betfred Championship. 

He previously played for Wakefield Trinity (Heritage № 1361) in the Super League. He made his professional début in 2013.

Club career

Bradford Bulls (trial)
On 5 Mar 2021 it was reported that he had joined Bradford Bulls on a one month trial, making his first team début in the 41-16 defeat to Featherstone Rovers in the 2021 Challenge Cup first round tie on Sun 21 Mar 2021.

International
In October 2013, Walker represented Wales in the 2013 Rugby League World Cup. Walker made his international début against the United States in a match that also saw him score his first international try. Walker was back to playing in the Red Jersey of the Cymru in the 2015 European Cup tournament.

He scored a try in the opening game against Scotland.

In October 2016, Walker played in the 2017 World Cup qualifiers.

Personal life
Walker was born with a potentially fatal brain condition, arteriovenous malformation (AVM), however was not diagnosed until 2017, forcing him to retire days before the 2017 Rugby League World Cup. Following treatment however, Walker was given the all-clear in April 2020 and was able to return to rugby.

References

External links
Profile at saints.org.uk
Wales profile
Welsh profile

1991 births
Living people
Bradford Bulls players
Dewsbury Rams players
English people of Welsh descent
English rugby league players
Rochdale Hornets players
Rugby league players from St Helens, Merseyside
Rugby league props
St Helens R.F.C. players
Wakefield Trinity players
Wales national rugby league team players
Whitehaven R.L.F.C. players
Widnes Vikings players